Bernhard Pörksen (born 1969) is a German media scholar.

Life 

Bernhard Pörksen studied German language and literature, journalism and biology in Hamburg. At the invitation of Ivan Illich he spent several research periods at Pennsylvania State University. Between 1996 and 1997, he worked both as a freelance journalist and as a voluntary editorial staff member of a newspaper. He has published essays, commentaries and critical contributions to debates in numerous German daily and weekly newspapers, magazines and online media.

Between 1997 and 1999, Pörksen prepared his thesis entitled Die Konstruktion von Feindbildern: zum Sprachgebrauch in neonazistischen Medien (English: The construction of enemy images on the use of language by neo-Nazi media). In 2000, he taught communication and linguistics at the University of Greifswald. From 2002 he held the position of a professor for journalism and communication studies at the University of Hamburg. In 2006 he deputized for the chair of communication theory and media culture at the University of Münster. In 2007 he successfully completed the formal qualifying procedures for independent research and teaching as a university professor for communication and media studies (Habilitation).

In 2008 he was offered the chair for media studies at the University of Tübingen. In November 2008 he was elected "Professor of the Year" and awarded special honors for his teaching activities. From 2009 to 2011 he was commissioner for the foundation and development of the institute of Media Studies at the University of Tübingen and its managing director. Pörksen is on the editorial board of multiple systemic-constructivist journals (Constructivist Foundations, Cybernetics and Human Knowing, and Familiendynamik).

Among the central topics of his research, counselling, and lecturing activities are the dynamics of public outrage, media scandals and questions of media ethics, models and theories of communication, styles of stage management in politics and the media, and journalism and celebrity. He is in constant demand on the different media as a welcome partner for interviews and debates and regularly comments on topical media-political developments. His book on modern systems theory and the philosophy of constructivism (together with the Austrian-American cybernetics Heinz von Foerster and the Chilean neurobiologist Humberto Maturana) are available in German, English, Italian, Danish, Korean and Spanish. His 1998 publication together with von Foerster, "Truth is the invention of a liar", is meanwhile considered a classic of systemic thought. Pörksen has written several books, together with his students, dealing with current media topics ("Trendbuch Journalismus", "Skandal! - Die Macht öffentlicher Empörung" [Scandal! The power of public outrage], "Medienmenschen - Wie man Wirklichkeit inszeniert" [Media personalities - How to stage realities], "Die Casting-Gesellschaft" [The casting society], and "Die gehetzte Politik" [Agitated politics]. In the book written with the colleague Hanne Detel, "The unleashed scandal. The end of control in the digital age" he shows that the evolution and escalation of the scandal has entered a new phase in the digital age. The claim is that each and everyone can nowadays trigger a scandal, and that each and everyone can become its target and victim. Traditional dramaturgical principles of the classical mass media, e.g. the height of a plunge to the depths, are no longer key criteria. The fundamental implication of the authors' analyses is that the uncontrollability of public effects has become an integral part of everybody's daily experience.

Books in English 

 with Heinz von Foerster: Understanding Systems. Conversations on Epistemology and Ethics. Carl-Auer-Systeme/Kluwer Academic; Publication/Plenum Publishers, Heidelberg/New York 2002.
 The Certainty of Unvertainty - Dialogues Introducing Constructivism. Imprint Academic, Exter 2004.
with Humberto R. Maturana: From Being to Doing. The Origins of the Biology of Cognition. Carl Auer, Heidelberg 2004.
The Creation of Reality. A Constructivist Epistemology of Journalism and Journalism Education. Imprint Academic, Exter 2011.
 with Hanne Detel: The unleashed scandal. The end of control in the digital age. Imprint Academic, Exeter 2014.

References

1969 births
Living people
German mass media scholars
Place of birth missing (living people)